Lunsemfwa Hydro Power Company Limited (LHPC), is an independent power producer (IPP) company based in the city of Kabwe in Zambia, with investments in the Central Province of the country. As of August 2022, the firm owns two operational hydroelectric power plants, with generation capacity of 58 MW. Another 455 MW, from two hydro power stations, are under development. The firm has ambitions to increase generation capacity to 500 MW in the medium term.

Location
Lunsemfwa Hydro Power Company maintains its headquarters in Kabwe, in Zambia's Central Province.

Overview
The firm was established in the early 2000s. As of August 2022, it owns a generation portfolio of 58 megawatts, including Mulungushi Hydroelectric Power Station (40 megawatts) and Lunsemfwa Hydroelectric Power Station (18 megawatts). Both of these were acquired in 2001, with financial backing from the World Bank. It is also involved in the development of Muchinga Hydroelectric Power Station (200 MW) and the Lunsemfwa Lower Hydroelectric Power Station (255 MW).

Ownership
The company is majority owned by Agua Imara, a subsidiary of the Norwegian IPP, Scatec. That acquisition took place in 2011. The shareholding in LHPC is illustrated in the table below.

Power stations
The table below illustrates the power stations in Lunsemfwa Hydro Power's generation portfolio as of August 2022. The list is not all inclusive.

See also
 Energy in Africa
 List of power stations in Zambia

References

External links
 About LHPCL

Electric power companies of Zambia
Renewable energy
Companies based in Kabwe
Energy companies established in 2001
2001 establishments in Zambia